Forsters Passage is a body of water between Bristol Island and Southern Thule in the South Sandwich Islands. In 1775, a British expedition under James Cook gave the name "Forster's Bay", after John R. Forster, a naturalist with the expedition, to what appeared to be a bay in essentially this position. The "bay" was determined to be a strait by a Russian expedition under Fabian Gottlieb von Bellingshausen in 1820.

References 

Straits of Antarctica
Landforms of South Georgia and the South Sandwich Islands